1049 Gotho, provisional designation , is a carbonaceous asteroid from the outer region of the asteroid belt, approximately 53 kilometers in diameter. It was discovered on 14 September 1925, by German astronomer Karl Reinmuth at Heidelberg Observatory in southwest Germany. Although the name of the asteroid is a masculine German name, it is not known to refer to a particular individual.

Orbit and classification 

Gotho orbits the Sun in the outer main-belt at a distance of 2.7–3.5 AU once every 5 years and 5 months (1,987 days). Its orbit has an eccentricity of 0.14 and an inclination of 15° with respect to the ecliptic.

Physical characteristics 

Gotho has been characterized as a C-type asteroid.

Lightcurves 

In April 2010, a rotational lightcurve of Gotho was obtained by astronomer Kenda Albers at the Oakley Southern Sky Observatory, Australia. Lightcurve analysis gave a rotation period of 8.470 hours with a brightness variation of 0.17 magnitude.

Diameter and albedo 

According to the surveys carried out by the Japanese Akari satellite and NASA's Wide-field Infrared Survey Explorer with its subsequent NEOWISE mission, Gotho measures between 53.56 and 56.296 kilometers in diameter and its surface has an albedo between 0.008 and 0.045 (without preliminary results). The Collaborative Asteroid Lightcurve Link derives an albedo of 0.0469 and a diameter of 51.05 kilometers using an absolute magnitude of 10.4.

Naming 

For this minor planet, any reference of its name to a person or occurrence is unknown.

Unknown meaning 

Among the many thousands of named minor planets, Gotho is one of 120 asteroids, for which no official naming citation has been published.

References

External links 
 1049-Gotho-1925-RB, universetoday.com
 When was the comet or asteroid 1049 Gotho (1925 RB) (Gotho) first and last observed, universetoday.com
 Asteroid Lightcurve Database (LCDB), query form (info )
 Dictionary of Minor Planet Names, Google books
 Asteroids and comets rotation curves, CdR – Observatoire de Genève, Raoul Behrend
 Discovery Circumstances: Numbered Minor Planets (1)-(5000) – Minor Planet Center
 
 

001049
Discoveries by Karl Wilhelm Reinmuth
Named minor planets
19250914